Since the first Unified Command Plan was approved on 14 December 1946, several unified and specified (see JP 1-02, p. 222) combatant commands have been established and disestablished.  Some of the commands existed before they were officially established as unified or specified commands, or continued to exist after they were disestablished as such.

References

Unified combatant commands
former